Major-General Henry William Newcome  (14 July 1875 – 25 February 1963) was a British Army officer.

Military career
Newcome was commissioned into the Royal Artillery and saw action in South Africa during the Second Boer War. He served on the Western Front in the First World War with the Royal Field Artillery for which he was appointed a Companion of the Distinguished Service Order. He was the Brigadier-General Royal Artillery in the 21st Division from May 1917 to November 1918.

After the war he succeeded Brigadier-General William Basil Browell as Commandant of the Chapperton Down Artillery School in November 1918, became Commander, Royal Artillery at Northern Command in April 1923 and General Officer Commanding Baluchistan District in India in March 1931. He went on to be Major-General, Royal Artillery for the Indian Army in February 1933 and then General Officer Commanding the 50th (Northumbrian) Division from April 1928 until he retired in February 1931.

He was appointed a Companion of the Order of St Michael and St George in the 1919 New Year Honours and Companion of the Order of the Bath in the 1923 New Year Honours.

References

Bibliography

 

1875 births
1963 deaths
British Army personnel of the Second Boer War
Military personnel from Portsmouth
British Army major generals
Companions of the Order of the Bath
Companions of the Order of St Michael and St George
Companions of the Distinguished Service Order
Royal Artillery officers
British Army generals of World War I